Ben Sexton (born June 6, 1991) is a Canadian former professional ice hockey forward who played with the Ottawa Senators in the National Hockey League (NHL). A centreman, he was selected by the Boston Bruins in the seventh round, 206th overall, of the 2009 NHL Entry Draft. Sexton is the son of one of the Ottawa Senators' founding partners, Randy Sexton.

Playing career

Collegiate
Sexton played four years at Clarkson University. In his junior year, Sexton was named team captain and was named to the ECAC Hockey All-Academic team. He was also awarded Clarkson's Mike Morrison Dedication Award and Clarkson Ironman Award. The following season, again serving as captain, Sexton was named to the ECAC Hockey All-Academic team for the second year in a row.

Professional
On March 20, 2014, Sexton signed an entry level contract with the Boston Bruins and was subsequently assigned to their American Hockey League affiliate, the Providence Bruins.

On July 1, 2017, Sexton signed a two-year, two-way contract with the Ottawa Senators. Sexton was assigned to the Senators' American Hockey League affiliate, the Belleville Senators, after training camp. Sexton received a call-up in March 2018 and played his first NHL game on March 26, 2018, against the Carolina Hurricanes. He was reassigned to the AHL a game later. At the conclusion of the season, Sexton was Belleville's nominee for the Yanick Dupre Memorial Award as AHL man of the year.

On December 5, Sexton and Macoy Erkamps were traded to the Pittsburgh Penguins in exchange for Stefan Elliott and Tobias Lindberg. Reassigned to AHL affiliate, the Wilkes-Barre/Scranton Penguins, Sexton appeared in 26 games, accruing seven goals and three assists for 10 points.

As a free agent from the Pittsburgh Penguins, Sexton opted to remain within the organization by continuing with Wilkes-Barre/Scranton on a one-year AHL contract on July 11, 2019.

Having missed the entirety of the 2019–20 season due to a concussion injury, Sexton announced his retirement after 7 professional seasons on May 9, 2020.

Personal life
Sexton comes from a family of hockey players; his father is one of the Ottawa Senators' founding partners, Randy Sexton. His younger brother Patrick played NCAA hockey for the University of Wisconsin from 2015–2017.

Career statistics

References

External links
 

1991 births
Albany Devils players
Belleville Senators players
Boston Bruins draft picks
Canadian ice hockey centres
Clarkson Golden Knights men's ice hockey players
Ice hockey people from Ottawa
Living people
Ottawa Senators players
Penticton Vees players
Providence Bruins players
Wilkes-Barre/Scranton Penguins players